Brocchinia hitchcockii is a species of plant in the genus Brocchinia. This species is endemic to the Amazonas region of southern Venezuela.

References

hitchcockii
Endemic flora of Venezuela
Flora of the Amazon
Plants described in 1957